Aethozoidae is a family of bryozoans belonging to the order Ctenostomatida.

The following genera are accepted within the family, according to the World Register of Marine Species:

 Aethozooides Schwaha, Bernhard, Edgcomb & Todaro, 2019
 Aethozoon Hayward, 1978
 Franzenella d'Hondt, 1983
 Solella Schwaha, Bernhard, Edgcomb & Todaro, 2019

References

Bryozoan families
Ctenostomatida